Chile is scheduled to compete at the 2017 World Aquatics Championships in Budapest, Hungary from 14 July to 30 July.

Diving

Chile has entered 2 divers (two male).

Men

Open water swimming

Chile has entered one open water swimmer

Swimming

Chilean swimmers have achieved qualifying standards in the following events (up to a maximum of 2 swimmers in each event at the A-standard entry time, and 1 at the B-standard):

Synchronized swimming

Chile's synchronized swimming team consisted of 2 athletes (2 female).

Women

References

Nations at the 2017 World Aquatics Championships
2017
World Aquatics Championships